The BFW M.29 was a single-engine two-seat low-wing aircraft, designed by Willy Messerschmitt for the 1932 Circuit of Europe races.

Development
Messerschmitt  M 23s had won the Circuit of Europe or Challenge International de Tourisme in both 1929 and 1930, assisting sales of the aircraft. The M.29 was designed to repeat this success. It was a low-wing cantilever monoplane of slightly smaller span than the M.23, with an enclosed continuous cockpit for two in tandem which blended smoothly into a dorsal fairing that extended aft to the fin. The latter carried a wide chord rudder and an all-moving tailplane, mounted on bracing towards the top of the fin. It had a clean cantilever spatted undercarriage. The wings could be folded at wing root hinges, back along the fuselage sides.

The aircraft could be powered either by a closely cowled 112 kW (150 hp) Siemens-Halske Sh 14a seven-cylinder radial engine (M.29a) or an air-cooled inverted inline Argus As 8R (a high-powered racing version of the Argus As 8) of the same power (M.29b).

Operational history
Four aircraft of both variants were delivered for testing a few days before the start of racing on 27 August 1932. Initial reactions were that the machine was both fast and responsive. However, within days one aircraft had disintegrated in mid-air, killing the pilot and another was lost in the same way on approach to landing. The pilot in the second accident, Reinhold Poss bailed out, though his observer was killed, and reported that the disintegration began at the tailplane, progressing forward. All M.29s were grounded, missing the race, whilst the tail structure was strengthened.

The remaining race machines, joined by at least one more, flew successfully after modification.  There is photographic evidence of six M.29s.

Variants
Note
M.29a: 112 kW (150 hp) Siemens Sh 14a radial engine
M.29b: 112 kW (150 hp) Argus As 8R inline engine

Specifications (M.29b)

References

Citations

Cited sources

1930s German sport aircraft
M 29
Low-wing aircraft
Aircraft first flown in 1932